Olsäng  is a village in Karlskrona Municipality, Blekinge County, southeastern Sweden.

Populated places in Karlskrona Municipality
Populated coastal places in Sweden